Shashidhar Reddy (born 7 October 1995) is an Indian cricketer. He made his Twenty20 debut on 15 November 2019, for Hyderabad in the 2019–20 Syed Mushtaq Ali Trophy. He made his first-class debut on 9 December 2019, for Hyderabad in the 2019–20 Ranji Trophy.

References

External links
 

1995 births
Living people
Indian cricketers
Hyderabad cricketers
Place of birth missing (living people)